Jarryd Lyons (born 22 July 1992) is a professional Australian rules footballer playing for the Brisbane Lions in the Australian Football League (AFL). He previously played for the Adelaide Football Club from 2011 to 2016 and the Gold Coast Suns from 2017 to 2018.

Early life
Lyons attended Malvern's De La Salle College.

AFL career

Adelaide (2011–2016)
He did not play in his first AFL season, but showed good signs with South Australian National Football League (SANFL) side, . Lyons made his AFL debut in round 5 of the 2012 season, against  at AAMI Stadium in Showdown XXXII. He played only three games in that season but continued to perform in the SANFL and could have played more if it hadn't been for an ill-timed foot injury. Lyons played nine games in 2013, including a 21-disposal game against  in round 9 and a four-goal effort against  in round 16.

Lyons played ten games in 2014, beginning to cement his place in the side in the latter half of the year. Despite again attracting interest in the trading period, Lyons rebuffed all other offers to sign with the Crows for another two years. In late 2014 Lyons was bitten on the leg while asleep and developed symptoms consistent with a white-tailed spider bite, leading to him being hospitalised. He recovered to play 13 games for the 2015 season, nine of them as Adelaide's starting substitute, in what was a trying year for the club, following the mid-season murder of their coach, Phil Walsh. Lyons had his best season at the Crows in 2016, playing 20 games, kicking 15 goals and averaging 22 disposals, in his first season under new coach Don Pyke.

Gold Coast (2017–2018)
Lyons slotted straight into the midfield at the Suns and enjoyed a career-best season in 2017, playing 18 games and averaging 25 disposals, despite the Suns only winning six games and their coach, Rodney Eade, being sacked towards the end of the season. Lyons played 19 games in 2018 and again averaged 25 disposals, and was also equal-third in the AFL for clearances. Despite this, new coach Stuart Dew dropped him twice during the season, and he was delisted at the end of the season with a year left on his three-year contract.

Brisbane Lions (2019–present)
After accumulating 33 disposals and eight marks in a best-on-ground performance in the win against  at the Gabba in round 11, Lyons had a career-best game in the win against Port Adelaide at Adelaide Oval in round 17, accumulating 36 disposals and nine tackles, and followed up a week later against North Melbourne with 30 disposals and two goals. He went on to poll a career-high 13 votes in the Brownlow Medal and finished fourth in voting for the Merrett–Murray Medal, in what was a career-best season.

Statistics
Updated to the end of the 2022 season.

|-
| 2011 ||  || 31
| 0 || — || — || — || — || — || — || — || — || — || — || — || — || — || — || 0
|- 
| 2012 ||  || 31
| 3 || 1 || 1 || 10 || 16 || 26 || 5 || 6 || 0.3 || 0.3 || 3.3 || 5.3 || 8.7 || 1.7 || 2.0 || 0
|-
| 2013 ||  || 31
| 9 || 5 || 6 || 86 || 63 || 149 || 24 || 22 || 0.6 || 0.7 || 9.6 || 7.0 || 16.6 || 2.7 || 2.4 || 0
|-
| 2014 ||  || 31
| 10 || 7 || 4 || 79 || 54 || 133 || 22 || 25 || 0.7 || 0.4 || 7.9 || 5.4 || 13.3 || 2.2 || 2.5 || 0
|-
| 2015 ||  || 31
| 13 || 4 || 2 || 86 || 64 || 150 || 22 || 25 || 0.3 || 0.2 || 6.6 || 4.9 || 11.5 || 1.7 || 1.9 || 0
|-
| 2016 ||  || 31
| 20 || 15 || 13 || 242 || 191 || 433 || 66 || 94 || 0.8 || 0.7 || 12.1 || 9.6 || 21.7 || 3.3 || 4.7 || 0
|-
| 2017 ||  || 25
| 18 || 10 || 8 || 226 || 217 || 443 || 67 || 83 || 0.6 || 0.4 || 12.6 || 12.1 || 24.6 || 3.7 || 4.6 || 6
|-
| 2018 ||  || 25
| 19 || 7 || 15 || 281 || 186 || 467 || 51 || 103 || 0.4 || 0.8 || 14.8 || 9.8 || 24.6 || 2.7 || 5.4 || 2
|-
| 2019 ||  || 17
| 24 || 14 || 10 || 338 || 234 || 572 || 72 || 143 || 0.6 || 0.4 || 14.1 || 9.8 || 23.8 || 3.0 || 6.0 || 13
|-
| 2020 ||  || 17
| 19 || 4 || 10 || 255 || 156 || 411 || 64 || 77 || 0.2 || 0.5 || 13.4 || 8.2 || 21.6 || 3.4 || 4.1 || 9
|-
| 2021 ||  || 17
| 24 || 10 || 7 || 395 || 279 || 674 || 119 || 154 || 0.4 || 0.3 || 16.5 || 11.6 || 28.1 || 5.0 || 6.4 || 23
|-
| 2022 ||  || 17
| 22 || 7 || 10 || 316 || 170 || 486 || 87 || 112 || 0.3 || 0.5 || 14.4 || 7.7 || 22.1 || 4.0 || 5.1 || 7
|- class=sortbottom
! colspan=3 | Career
! 181 !! 84 !! 86 !! 2313 !! 1630 !! 3943 !! 599 !! 845 !! 0.5 !! 0.5 !! 12.8 !! 9.0 !! 21.8 !! 3.3 !! 4.7 !! 60
|}

Notes

Honours and achievements
 2× Marcus Ashcroft Medal: 2021 (both games)

References

External links

 
 

1992 births
Living people
Adelaide Football Club players
Gold Coast Football Club players
Brisbane Lions players
Adelaide Football Club (SANFL) players
Australian rules footballers from Victoria (Australia)
Sandringham Dragons players